is a Japanese actor from Shimonoseki. Even though he and fellow Kamen Rider Kabuto: God Speed Love-exclusive Rider actor Mitsuki Koga/Kamen Rider Ketaros were only Kamen Riders within the movie, they did make a guest appearance during the final episode of the series as two people affected by the necklaces that transform people into Natives.

Selected filmography 
 Boutaoshi! (2003)
 Rockers (2003)
 School Wars: HERO (2004)
 Bubu Again (2004)
 Concrete  a.k.a. Konkurîto (2004)
 Kamachi (2004)
 Sukûru deizu a.k.a. School Daze (2005)
 Pray (2005)
 Linda Linda Linda (2005)
 Saigo no bansan a.k.a. The Last Supper (2005)
 Yumeno (2005)
 Kamen Rider Kabuto: God Speed Love (2005)
 Hōkyō Monogatari (2006)
 The Cottage (2006)
 Cat Girl Kiki (2006)
 Stay (2007)
 Watch Me (Kansatsu: Eien ni Kimi wo Mitsumete) (2007)
 SAI-REN (2007)
 Little DJ (2007)
 Makiguri no Ana (Peeping Tom) (2007)
 Building and the Zoo (2008)
 Kizumomo (2008)
 Bodyjack (2008)
 Running on Empty (2009)
 Lost Paradise in Tokyo (2010)
 Sweet Silly Love Song (2010)
 The Death Penalty Standards (Shikei Kijun) (2011)
 Gene Waltz (2011)
 Furusatogaeri-Going Home- (2011)
 Synchronicity (2011)
 Arakawa Under the Bridge (2012)
 The Devil's Path (Kyōaku) (2013)
 Maestro!  (2015)
 The Emperor in August (2015)
 Bloosoming Into A Family (Madou: After the Rain) (2016)
 Wilderness (2017)
 Kamen Rider Build (2017-2018)
 Last Winter, We Parted (2018)
 Zenigata (2018)
 Dad, Chibi is Gone (2019)
 Family Bond (2020)
 Pop! (2021)
 Shin Ultraman (2022)

References

External links
Katsuya Kobayashi(@cobakatsu1210) - Twitter (in Japanese)
Katsuya Kobayashi(cobakatsu1210) - Instagram (in Japanese)

1981 births
Living people
Japanese male actors
People from Shimonoseki